The Tamil Nadu State Film Award for Best Film is given by the Government of Tamil Nadu as part of its annual Tamil Nadu State Film Awards for Tamil (Kollywood) films. It includes prizes for three top places.

Key

List of winners

References

General

Specific 

Film
Awards for best film